The Bank of Adelaide was founded in 1865 in Adelaide, the capital of South Australia. It was incorporated by an act of the Parliament of South Australia. The original directors of the company were Henry Ayers, Thomas Greaves Waterhouse, Robert Barr Smith, Thomas Magarey and George Peter Harris.

The bank had most of its branches within South Australia, including head office at 81 King William street Adelaide. Interstate branches were located in Sydney NSW, Belconnen ACT, Canberra ACT, Brisbane, Dandenong VIC, Hobart TAS, Melbourne VIC, Townsville QLD, Woden ACT. The bank also had a branch in central London at 11 Leadenhall street.

The Bank of Adelaide was taken over in 1979 by ANZ and merged into that organisation, after bailing out a subsidiary finance company (the Finance Corporation of Australia) that had lent too much to people without the security to cover the loans.

References

External links 

 

Australia and New Zealand Banking Group
Banks disestablished in 1979
Banks established in 1865
Defunct banks of Australia